Richard Milroy Clarkson OBE FCGI FRAeS (14 July 1904 – 7 October 1996) was a British aeronautical engineer with de Havilland, then Hawker Siddeley. He led the design of the HS121 Trident wing, certain features of which were subsequently used for the Airbus A300 wing in the late 1960s.

Early life
He attended Clayesmore School in Dorset.

Career

de Havilland
He joined de Havilland at Edgware in 1925.

He was responsible for the aerodynamics of the de Havilland Mosquito. The first Mosquito W4050 flew in November 1940. He became Head of Aerodynamics in 1935, and Assistant Chief Engineer in 1941.

Hawker Siddeley Aviation
He was responsible for the aerodynamics of the DH.121 Trident and his team later designed the wing for the Airbus A300.

He retired in February 1969.

Personal life
He married Sylvia Paice in 1940, and they had one daughter. He received the OBE in the 1950 New Year Honours. In April 1964 he became a Fellow of City and Guilds. He received the Gold Medal of the Royal Aeronautical Society in 1966. From the Royal Society he received the Mullard Award in 1969 for his work on the Trident.

He died in Somerset in 1996.

See also
 A. H. Tiltman, another de Havilland designer
 Tim Wilkins OBE, Chief Designer for de Havilland

References

1904 births
1996 deaths
Aerodynamicists
De Havilland
De Havilland Mosquito
English aerospace engineers
Fellows of the Royal Aeronautical Society
Hawker Siddeley
People educated at Clayesmore School
Royal Aeronautical Society Gold Medal winners